Silesian-Lusatian Lowlands (or Silesian-Lusatian Uplands) are lowlands located in Silesia, Poland and Germany.

See also
 Silesian Highlands
 Silesian Lowlands
 Silesian Foothills
 Silesian-Moravian Foothills

Geography of Lower Silesian Voivodeship